Volte Alte is a village in Tuscany, central Italy, in the comune of Siena, province of Siena. At the time of the 2001 census its population was 46.

Volte Alte is about 9 km from Siena.

References 

Frazioni of Siena